Crank is the fourth studio album released by Scottish rock band the Almighty. Two singles, "Jonestown Mind" and "Wrench", were released from the album in multiple parts in the United Kingdom. Music videos were made for both singles. Crank peaked at #15 in the UK albums chart. The cover artwork, showing an angel throwing a Molotov cocktail at a planet (earth) made out of money was created by noted British artist and anarchist Jamie Reid, who also designed the famous ransom note cover for the Sex Pistols album, Never Mind the Bollocks, Here's the Sex Pistols.

The album was remastered and re-released only in Japan under the Victor Entertainment label including all the studio b-sides from singles released from the album.

Andy Cairns, frontman of the rock band Therapy?, contributed vocals to several tracks.

Track listing 
All songs written by Ricky Warwick except as indicated
 "Ultraviolent" – 3:25
 "Wrench" – 4:13
 "The Unreal Thing" – 4:02
 "Jonestown Mind" (Warwick, Friesen) – 3:42
 "Move Right In" (Friesen, Warwick) – 3:08
 "Crank and Deceit" (Warwick, Friesen, Del James) – 2:32
 "United State of Apathy" – 3:27
 "Welcome to Defiance" (Warwick, Friesen) – 3:39
 "Way Beyond Belief" (Friesen, Warwick, London, Munroe) – 5:00
 "Crackdown" – 2:57
 "Sorry for Nothing" (Warwick, Friesen) – 3:15
 "Cheat" – 2:40
 "Shitzophrenic" (London) -2:36
 hidden track; instrumental

1998 Japan remastered bonus tracks 
 "Knocking on Joe" – 3:57
 "Thanks Again, Again" (Warwick, James) – 4:11
 "Do Anything You Wanna Do" (Ed Hollis, Graeme Douglas) – 3:37
 Eddie & the Hot Rods cover
 "State of Emergency" (Jake Burns) – 2:29
 Stiff Little Fingers cover
 "Give Me Fire" (Colin Abrahall, Colin Blyth, Ross Lomas, Andrew Williams) – 3:03
 Charged GBH cover
 "Hellelujah" – 3:40
 "Jonestown Mind (Ruts Mix)" (Warwick, Friesen) – 5:24
 Remixed by Glen David "Dave" Ruffy & John "Segs" Jennings (The Ruts)

Personnel 
As listed in liner notes.

The Almighty
 Ricky Warwick – vocals, guitars
 Pete Friesen – guitars
 Floyd London – bass guitar, vocals
 Stump Munroe – drums

Additional musicians
 Andy Cairns – additional vocals
 Eileen Rose – additional vocals & spoken intro to "United State of Apathy"

Production
 Lorraine Frances – assistant engineer, The Manor
 Chris Sheldon – producer
 Matt Sime – assistant mixer, The Church, Crouch End [summer 1994]
 Phil Woods – assistant engineer, Ridge Farm Studio, Rusper (overdubs)

Mastered by Andy Van Dett at Masterdisk, New York

References 

1994 albums
The Almighty (band) albums
Albums produced by Chris Sheldon
Chrysalis Records albums
Victor Entertainment albums